Stellaria graminea is a species of flowering plant in the family Caryophyllaceae known by the common names common starwort, grass-leaved stitchwort, lesser stitchwort and grass-like starwort.

Description
It is a rhizomatous perennial herb producing branching stems which are prostrate, sprawling, trailing, or erect, and reach up to about 90 centimeters long. The stems are four-angled, weak, and hairless. The leaves are smooth-edged and hairless except for some hairs lining the bases. The inflorescence bears several flowers, each on a short pedicel. The flower has five pointed green sepals each a few millimeters long which are usually lined with hairs. There are five white petals, each so deeply lobed it appears to be two. It bears 10 stamens.

Distribution
It is native to Eurasia but it is widespread around other parts of the temperate world as an introduced species and a common weed.

Habitat
It grows in many types of habitat, including lawns and roadsides.

References

External links
Jepson Manual Treatment
Washington Burke Museum
Photo gallery

graminea
Flora of Europe
Flora of Asia
Plants described in 1753
Taxa named by Carl Linnaeus